The Chinese Ambassador to Switzerland is the official representative of the People's Republic of China to the Swiss Confederation.

List of representatives

See also
China–Switzerland relations

References 

 Ministry of Foreign Affairs of the People's Republic of China, Chinese Ambassadors to the Switzerland, 驻瑞士联邦历任大使 

 
China
Switzerland